A nine-part referendum was held in Switzerland on 14 January 1866. Only two proposals received a majority of votes in favour, and only one had both a majority of votes and majority of cantons.

Background
In order to pass, the referendums needed a double majority; a majority of the popular vote and majority of the cantons. The decision of each canton was based on the vote in that canton. Full cantons counted as one vote, whilst half cantons counted as half.

Results

Question I – weights and measures

Question II – equality of rights to settlement for Jews and naturalised people

Question III – local suffrage for settled people

Question IV – taxation and civil rights of settled people

Question V – cantonal suffrage for settled people

Question VI – religious and cultural freedom

Question VII – criminal law

Question VIII – copyright law

Question IX – prohibition of gambling and lotteries

References

1866 referendums
1866 in Switzerland
Referendums in Switzerland
January 1866 events